The Trojan Horse, according to legend, was a giant hollow horse in which Greeks hid to gain entrance to Troy. It is used metaphorically to mean any trick or strategy that causes a target to invite a foe into a securely protected place, or to deceive by appearance, hiding malevolent intent in an outwardly benign exterior. 

Trojan Horse may also refer to:
 Trojan horse (business), a business offer that appears to be a good deal but is not
 Trojan horse (computing), a computer program that appears harmless but is harmful

Art, entertainment, and media

Fictional entities
 White Base or The Trojan Horse, a fictional battleship from Mobile Suit Gundam

Literature
 Caballo de Troya or Trojan Horse, a 1984 science fiction novel by Juan José Benitez
 Creationism's Trojan Horse, a 2004 book on the origins of the intelligent design movement, by Barbara Forrest and Paul R. Gross
 The Trojan Horse, a 1940 novel by Hammond Innes
 The Trojan Horse (Morley novel), a novel by Christopher Morley
 Trojan Horse, a 2012 novel by Mark Russinovich

Music
 "Trojan Horse" (song), a 1978 song by Dutch girl group Luv'
 "Trojan Horse", a song by Bloc Party from the 2008 album Intimacy
 "Trojan Horse", a song by Agnes Obel from the 2016 album Citizen of Glass

Television
 The Trojan Horse (miniseries), a 2008 Canadian miniseries
 "Trojan Horse" (NCIS), an episode of NCIS
 "Trojan Horse" (The Avengers), an episode of the British TV series

See also
 Operation Trojan Horse (book), a 1970 book by John Keel
 Trojan Horse scandal, a 2014 scandal involving claims of a plot by Muslims to take over schools in Birmingham
 The Trojan Horse (film), the American title of the 1961 film La guerra di Troia
 Trojan Horse Incident, a 1985 incident in Athlone, Cape Town, in which police officers opened fire on stone-throwing protesters